Dimitrovgrad Municipality may refer to:

 Dimitrovgrad Municipality, Bulgaria
 Dimitrovgrad, Serbia

Municipality name disambiguation pages